Eumunida is a genus of squat lobsters. There are 29 recognised species in the genus, the majority of which are from the Pacific Ocean:

Eumunida ampliata De Saint Laurent & Poupin, 1996
Eumunida annulosa De Saint Laurent & Macpherson, 1990
Eumunida australis De Saint Laurent & Macpherson, 1990
Eumunida balssi Gordon, 1930
Eumunida bella De Saint Laurent & Macpherson, 1990
Eumunida bispinata Baba, 1990
Eumunida capillata De Saint Laurent & Macpherson, 1990
Eumunida chani Baba & Lin, 2008
Eumunida debilistriata Baba, 1977
Eumunida depressa De Saint Laurent & Poupin, 1996
Eumunida dofleini Gordon, 1930
Eumunida funambulus Gordon, 1930
Eumunida gordonae Baba, 1976
Eumunida karubar De Saint Laurent & Poupin, 1996
Eumunida keijii De Saint Laurent & Macpherson, 1990
Eumunida laevimana Gordon, 1930
Eumunida macphersoni De Saint Laurent & Poupin, 1996
Eumunida marginata De Saint Laurent & Macpherson, 1990
Eumunida minor De Saint Laurent & Macpherson, 1990
Eumunida multilineata De Saint Laurent & Poupin, 1996
Eumunida pacifica Gordon, 1930
Eumunida parva De Saint Laurent & Macpherson, 1990
Eumunida picta Smith, 1883
Eumunida similior Baba, 1990
Eumunida smithii Henderson, 1885
Eumunida spinosa Macpherson, 2006
Eumunida squamifera De Saint Laurent & Macpherson, 1990
Eumunida sternomaculata De Saint Laurent & Macpherson, 1990
Eumunida treguieri De Saint Laurent & Poupin, 1996

References

Squat lobsters
Taxa named by Sidney Irving Smith